In forensic psychiatry, a pseudocommando is a mass murderer who commits premeditated murder-suicide mass killings driven by revenge fantasies, typically involving the stockpiling of weapons followed by a heavily armed commando-style attack.

They typically see their actions through a narcissistic lens as being morally justified in revenge against their unfair treatment by an uncaring world, and wish to "go out in a blaze of glory".

Some observers have divided mass killers into three categories: pseudocommandos,  family annihilators, and hit-and-run killers.

See Also 

 Anders Behring Breivik

References 

Murder
Killings by type